

A Life Less Ordinary may refer to:

Film
 A Life Less Ordinary, 1997 romantic black comedy film

Music
 Soundtrack to the film A Life Less Ordinary, featuring songs by Beck, R.E.M., Elvis Presley, The Prodigy, Ash, Squirrel Nut Zippers, and The Cardigans
 A Life Less Ordinary (song), non-album single released by the band Ash

Television
 "A Life Less Ordinary", episode of the show Casualty, the British medical drama television series Casualty

Other uses
 Aalo Aandhari (A Life Less Ordinary), the autobiography of Baby Halder